Rodney Appleby is a bass guitarist who was part of Ian Gillan's backing band on the Deep Purple frontman's US solo tour in August and September 2006.

In November 2006, Appleby was shot in the jaw.

A native of Buffalo, New York, Appleby was inducted into the Buffalo Music Hall of Fame in 1995.
His daughter, Zuri Appleby is a bass guitarist and vocalist herself and is touring with Nick Jonas

References

Year of birth missing (living people)
Living people
American bass guitarists